Feather Woman Lake is located in Glacier National Park, in the U. S. state of Montana. The lake is often ice clogged and is  WSW of Sperry Glacier.

See also
List of lakes in Flathead County, Montana (A-L)

References

Lakes of Glacier National Park (U.S.)
Lakes of Flathead County, Montana